Wulverghem (also known as Wulvergem) is a Belgian village. It is the smallest village in the Heuvelland Municipality, with 260 people, and a total area of 350 hectares.

History
The area experienced many major battles during World War I, as part of the Ypres Salient area. On 30 April and 17 June 1916, the area was the site of two German gas attacks on British troops at Wulverghem. 

Wulverghem, along with the village of Frelinghien were believed to be the locations of the Christmas Day Truce of 1914 and the supposed football match that ensued.

References

Heuvelland
Populated places in West Flanders